is a Buddhist temple of the Jōdo-shū sect, in the city of Kamakura in Kanagawa Prefecture, Japan.

The temple is renowned for The Great Buddha of Kamakura, a monumental outdoor bronze statue of Amitābha, which is one of the most famous icons of Japan. It is also a designated National Treasure, and one of the twenty-two historic sites included in Kamakura's proposal for inclusion in UNESCO's World Heritage Sites.

The Great Buddha (Kamakura Daibutsu) 

 is a large bronze statue of Amitābha, located on the temple grounds. According to temple records, the statue dates from around 1252, during the Kamakura period, which it is named after.

The statue is hollow, and visitors can view the interior. Many visitors have left graffiti on the inside of the statue. At one time, there were thirty-two bronze lotus petals at the base of the statue, but only four remain, and they are no longer in place. A notice at the entrance to the grounds reads, "Stranger, whosoever thou art and whatsoever be thy creed, when thou enterest this sanctuary remember thou treadest upon ground hallowed by the worship of ages. This is the Temple of Buddha and the gate of the eternal, and should therefore be entered with reverence."

History 
The current bronze statue was preceded by a giant wooden Buddha, which was completed in 1243 after ten years of continuous labor, the funds having been raised by Lady Inada no Tsubone and the Buddhist priest Jōkō of Tōtōmi. The wooden statue was damaged by a storm in 1248, and the hall containing it was destroyed, so Jōkō suggested making a new statue of bronze, and the huge amount of money necessary for this and a new hall was raised for the project. The bronze image was probably cast by Ōno Gorōemon or Tanji Hisatomo, both leading casters of the time. At one time, the statue was gilded. There are still traces of gold leaf near the statue's ears.

The hall was destroyed by a storm in 1334, was rebuilt, was damaged by yet another storm in 1369, and was rebuilt yet again. The last building housing the statue was washed away in the tsunami resulting from the Nankai earthquake of 20 September 1498, during the Muromachi period. Since then, the Great Buddha has stood in the open air.

The 1923 Great Kantō earthquake destroyed the base the statue sits upon, but the base was repaired in 1925. Repairs to the statue were carried out in 1960–61, when the neck was strengthened and measures were taken to protect it from earthquakes. In early 2016, further research, restoration, and preservation work was performed on the statue.

Measurements 
 Weight: 
 Height: 
 Length of face: 
 Length of eye: 
 Length of mouth: 
 Length of ear: 
 Length from knee to knee: 
 Circumference of thumb:

In arts and poetry 
The statue is referred to as the ″Buddha at Kamakura″ in several verses that preface the initial chapters of the novel Kim by Rudyard Kipling (1901). The verses were taken from the poem of the same name the author wrote after visiting Kamakura in 1892. The poem appears in its entirety in Kipling's poetry collection The Five Nations of 1903.

See also 

 Glossary of Japanese Buddhism – for an explanation of terms concerning Japanese Buddhism, Japanese Buddhist art, and Japanese Buddhist temple architecture.
 List of National Treasures of Japan (sculptures)
 Tian Tan Buddha – located in Hong Kong, world's tallest seated Buddha statue
 Tōdai-ji – temple in Nara, home to largest bronze Buddha statue in Japan
 Ushiku Daibutsu – Japan's tallest statue of a Buddha in Ushiku, Ibaraki Prefecture, Japan

References

External links 

 Kotoku-in Homepage (in English)
 Kamakura Today website "Kotoku-in (The Great Buddha)" page
 Kamakura Trip website "Kamakura Daibutsu (Great Buddha of Kamakura)" page (in English)
 

Buddhist temples in Kamakura, Kanagawa
Colossal Buddha statues
National Treasures of Japan
Outdoor sculptures in Japan
Pure Land temples
Religious buildings and structures completed in 1243
13th-century Buddhist temples